Seyfert's Sextet is a group of galaxies about 190 million light-years away in the constellation Serpens. The group appears to contain six members, but one of the galaxies, NGC 6027d, is a background object and another "galaxy," NGC 6027e, is actually a part of the tail from galaxy NGC 6027. The gravitational interaction among these galaxies should continue for hundreds of millions of years. Ultimately, the galaxies will merge to form a single giant elliptical galaxy.

Discovery
The group was discovered by Carl Keenan Seyfert using photographic plates made at the Barnard Observatory of Vanderbilt University.  When these results were first published in 1951, this group was the most compact group ever identified.

Members

See also
 Wild's Triplet
 Zwicky's Triplet
 Robert's Quartet
 Stephan's Quintet and NGC 7331 Group ( Also known as the Deer Lick Group, about half a degree northeast of Stephan's Quintet)
 Copeland Septet

References

External links
ASAHI Net Free Address Service: Seyfert's Sextet (Galaxy Group in Serpens) 

SEDS: Seyfert's Sextet (HCG 79)

79
10116
Serpens (constellation)